The 15069 / 15070 Gorakhpur Junction - Badshahnagar Intercity Express is an Express train belonging to Indian Railways North Eastern Railway zone that runs between  and  via  in India.

Coaches
The 15069 / 70 Gorakhpur Junction - Badshahnagar Intercity Express has 1 AC Chair Car, 1 AC third,  6 Non AC chair car, 4 general unreserved & 2 SLR (seating with luggage rake) coaches . It does not carry a pantry car coach.

As is customary with most train services in India, coach composition may be amended at the discretion of Indian Railways depending on demand.

Service

Routing

Traction
As the route from Gonda to Gorakhpur via Barhni is not electrified, a   based WDP4D diesel locomotive pulls the train to its destination.

References

External links
15069 Intercity Express at India Rail Info
15070 Intercity Express at India Rail Info

Intercity Express (Indian Railways) trains
Passenger trains originating from Gorakhpur